Roman Tales is a 1955 Italian comedy film directed by Gianni Franciolini. It is based on several short stories collected in Racconti romani by Alberto Moravia. The film won two David di Donatello Awards, for best director and best producer.

Plot 
In Rome, during the Fifties, three boys attempt to commit a robbery. They're Mario, Alvaro and Otello, aided by a trickster, Professor Semprini, who claims to be a great intellectual. In reality the man is just the garbage boy of the upright lawyer Mazzoni Baralla, who goes on the trail of the three boys as soon as they attempt the shot. Indeed, Alvaro, Mario and Otello are arrested, after being deceived by Semprini, who demands from them a payment for the design of the plan. In fact the three first attempt to pass off counterfeit notes, then pretend to be guards from the vice squad in Villa Borghese. After the arrest and acquittal, the three decide to return to their old and simple jobs.

Cast 

 Totò: Professor Semprini
 Vittorio De Sica: Lawyer Mazzoni Baralla
 Silvana Pampanini: Maria
 Franco Fabrizi: Alvaro
 Antonio Cifariello: Otello
 Giancarlo Costa: Spartaco
 Maurizio Arena: Mario
 Sergio Raimondi: Valerio Zerboni
 Nando Bruno: Amilcare
 Mario Riva: The Waiter
 Mario Carotenuto: The "Commendatore"
 Eloisa Cianni: Iris
 Giovanna Ralli: Marcella
 Maria Pia Casilio: Annita
 Anita Durante:  Alvaro's Mother
 Turi Pandolfini: Client of the Barber 
 Aldo Giuffrè: Lawyer

References

External links

1955 films
Italian comedy films
1955 comedy films
Films based on works by Alberto Moravia
Films directed by Gianni Franciolini
Films with screenplays by Age & Scarpelli
Films scored by Mario Nascimbene
1950s Italian films